Hauula is a census-designated place and rural community in the Koolauloa District on the island of Oahu, City & County of Honolulu.  In Hawaiian, hauula means "red hau" (hau is a type of tree: Hibiscus tiliaceus). There is a small commercial center. As of the 2020 census, the CDP population was 4,018.

A fringing reef extends off the shoreline. There are several beaches and  beach parks in Hauula, including Hauula Beach Park, Aukai Beach Park, Kokololio Beach Park, and Mahakea Beach. Sugarcane was once grown along the narrow coastal plain inland from the highway.

The U.S. postal code for Hauula is 96717. There is a two-bay fire station located on Kamehameha Highway.

Geography
Hauula is located at  (21.613850, -157.913543).  The town is located north of Punaluu and south of Lāie along Kamehameha Highway (State Rte. 83).

There are also hiking trails in Hauula. The 2.5 mile Hauula Loop trail that wraps along the side of the mountain, providing views of the coast and protecting reef. The trail head is also shared with the Ma'akau Gulch and the Ma'akau Ridge hikes.

Climate

Demographics

As of the census of 2020, there were 4,018 people and 789 households residing in the CDP. The racial makeup of the CDP was 16.82% White, 0.77% African American, 0.36% Native American, 5.72% Asian, 37.44% Pacific Islander, 0.96% from other races, and 37.93% from two or more races. Hispanic or Latino of any race were 9.81% of the population.

Education
Hawaii Department of Education operates public schools. Hauula Elementary School is in the CDP. Asia Pacific International School Hawaii Campus offers private education from kindergarten to 12th grade, with boarding option from 5th grade onwards.

References

Census-designated places in Honolulu County, Hawaii
Populated coastal places in Hawaii